Cappercleuch is a settlement on the A708, at St. Mary's Loch in the Scottish Borders area of Scotland, in the historic county of Selkirkshire.

Places nearby include Bowerhope Law, Craigierig, Deer Law, the Dryhope Tower, Ettrickbridge, the Ettrick Forest, the Megget Reservoir, the Megget Water, Mountbenger, the former Tibbie Shiels Inn, the Yarrow Water and the Glen Cafe overlooking the Loch of the Lowes.

See also
List of places in the Scottish Borders
List of places in Scotland

External links

CANMORE/RCAHMS record of Gordon Arms Hotel; Cappercleuch; Gordon Arms Inn
RCAHMS record of Cappercleuch, General
CANMORE/RCAHMS record of Cappercleuch Kirk; Cappercleuch Free Church

Villages in the Scottish Borders